The Medical Standard was an American medical journal published by G.P. Engelhard in Chicago, Illinois starting in 1887, and running through at least 1931.

According to a Hathitrust record, the previous title was the North American Practitioner.

References 

Publications established in 1887
Publications disestablished in 1931
General medical journals